Unleashed is the second and final album by the American hip hop group The UMC's. It was released on January 25, 1994 under Wild Pitch Records.

Track listing

Charts

References

External links
 

1994 albums
The U.M.C.'s albums
Wild Pitch Records albums